Liege Killer is a science fiction novel by American writer Christopher Hinz. The book and its sequels Ash Ock and The Paratwa are set in human colonies in orbit around a desolated post-apocalyptic Earth.

The antagonists of the books are the Paratwa, a new species resulting from experimentation on human embryos in the near future. They are a single consciousness occupying pairs of telepathically linked bodies. The Paratwa are highly skilled warriors but look like normal people; the only way to identify a Paratwa match is by inflicting a great deal of pain upon one of them, and observing the pain in the other.

The books follow the activities of humans and Paratwa as these old enemies are reunited more than a century after the earth's apocalypse, during which humans had believed the Paratwa were extinct.

The novel won the Compton Crook Award in 1988.

In 2013, Liege-Killer was adapted into a graphic novel, Binary, also written by Chris Hinz, and illustrated by Jon Proctor.

Sequels
 Ash Ock (1989)
 The Paratwa (1991)

1987 American novels
1987 science fiction novels
Post-apocalyptic novels
Debut science fiction novels
1987 debut novels